Emba Soira (also transliterated Sowera) is the highest mountain in Eritrea. The mountain is situated in the southeastern part of the Debub (Southern) administrative region in central Eritrea.

Emba Soira is reached by a paved road from the city of Senafe, located 135 kilometres south of the national capital Asmara. From there, a very difficult and perilous dirt track heading east for almost 20 kilometres leads to the mountain. The last part must be trekked and takes at least a few hours of travel.

Israeli military listening post 
In mid-2016, press messages based on information from the Eritrean opposition suggested that Israel had completed the construction of a military listening post on the Emba Soira to monitor the movement of the Arab coalition involved in the war in Yemen and to eavesdrop on Iran. The installation would also be aimed at observing the Bab-el-Mandeb Strait and the movement of commercial shipping in the southern Red Sea. In an official press release, the Eritrean Ministry of Information has vehemently denied the existence of this installation, calling it "ludicrous disinformation", "deliberately planted by certain countries and agencies to serve ulterior agendas".

The first indication that the listening post was established came in a report from the American geopolitical intelligence platform, Stratfor which said in December 2012 that both Israel and Iran had bases in Eritrea. The report said: "According to Stratfor diplomatic and media sources, Israel has small naval teams in the Dahlak archipelago and Massawa and a listening post in Amba Soira. Israel's presence in Eritrea is very focused and precise, involving intelligence gathering in the Red Sea and monitoring Iran's activities. Various Stratfor diplomatic sources have said that Israel's presence in Eritrea is small but significant."

Climate

References

 Mountains of Eritrea
 Highest points of countries